An alum is a type of chemical compound, usually a hydrated double sulfate salt of aluminium with the general formula , where  is a monovalent cation such as potassium or ammonium. By itself, "alum" often refers to potassium alum, with the formula . Other alums are named after the monovalent ion, such as sodium alum and ammonium alum.

The name "alum" is also used, more generally, for salts with the same formula and structure, except that aluminium is replaced by another trivalent metal ion like chromium, and/or sulfur is replaced by another chalcogen like selenium. The most common of these analogs is chrome alum .

In most industries, the name "alum" (or "papermaker's alum") is used to refer to aluminium sulfate, which is used for most industrial flocculation (the variable  is an integer whose size depends on the amount of water absorbed into the alum). In medicine, "alum" may also refer to aluminium hydroxide gel used as a vaccine adjuvant.

History

Alum found at archaeological sites
The western desert of Egypt was a major source of alum substitutes in antiquity.
The Ancient Greek Herodotus mentions Egyptian alum as a valuable commodity in The Histories.

The production of potassium alum from alunite is archaeologically attested on the island Lesbos.
The site was abandoned in the 7th century CE, but dates back at least to the 2nd century CE. Native alumen from the island of Melos appears to have been a mixture mainly of alunogen with potassium alum and other minor sulfates.

Alumen in Pliny and Dioscorides
A detailed description of a substance called alumen occurs in the Roman Pliny the Elder's Natural History.

By comparing Pliny's description with the account of stupteria given by Dioscorides, it is obvious the two are identical. Pliny informs us that a form of alumen was found naturally in the earth, and calls it salsugoterrae.

Pliny wrote that different substances were distinguished by the name of alumen, but they were all characterised by a certain degree of astringency, and were all employed in dyeing and medicine. Pliny wrote that there is another kind of alum that the Greeks call schiston, and which "splits into filaments of a whitish colour". From the name schiston and the mode of formation, it appears that this kind was the salt that forms spontaneously on certain salty minerals, as alum slate and bituminous shale, and consists chiefly of sulfates of iron and aluminium. One kind of alumen was a liquid, which was apt to be adulterated; but when pure it had the property of blackening when added to pomegranate juice. This property seems to characterize a solution of iron sulfate in water; a solution of ordinary (potassium) alum would possess no such property. Contamination with iron sulfate was greatly disliked as this darkened and dulled dye colours. In some places the iron sulfate may have been lacking, so the salt would be white and would be suitable, according to Pliny, for dyeing bright colors.

Pliny describes several other types of alumen but it is not clear as to what these minerals are. The alumen of the ancients, then, was not always potassium alum, not even an alkali aluminum sulfate.

Alum described in medieval texts
Alum and green vitriol (iron sulfate) both have sweetish and astringent taste, and they had overlapping uses. Therefore, through the Middle Ages, alchemists and other writers do not seem to have discriminated the two salts accurately from each other. In the writings of the alchemists we find the words misy, sory, and chalcanthum applied to either compound; and the name atramentum sutorium, which one might expect to belong exclusively to green vitriol, applied indifferently to both.

Alum was the most common mordant (substance used to set dyes on fabrics) used in the dye industry in the Islamic middle ages. It was the main export of the Chad region, from where it was transported to the markets of Egypt and Morocco, and then on to Europe. Other, less significant, sources were found in Egypt and Yemen.

Modern understanding of the alums
In the early 1700s, G.E. Stahl claimed that reacting sulfuric acid with limestone produced a sort of alum. The error was soon corrected by J.H. Pott and A.S. Marggraf, who showed that the precipitate obtained when an alkali is poured into a solution of alum, namely alumina, is quite different from lime and chalk, and is one of the ingredients in common clay.

Marggraf also showed that perfect crystals with properties of alum can be obtained by dissolving alumina in sulfuric acid and adding potash or ammonia to the concentrated solution. In 1767, Torbern Bergman observed the need for potassium or ammonium sulfates to convert aluminium sulfate into alum, while sodium or calcium would not work.

The composition of common alum was finally determined by Vauquelin in 1797. As soon as Klaproth discovered the presence of potassium in leucite and lepidolite,
Vauquelin demonstrated that common alum is a double salt, composed of sulfuric acid, alumina, and potash. In the same journal volume, Chaptal published the analysis of four different kinds of alum, namely, Roman alum, Levant alum, British alum, and an alum manufactured by himself, confirming Vauquelin's result.

Production
Some alums occur as minerals, the most important being alunite.

The most important alums – potassium, sodium, and ammonium – are produced industrially. Typical recipes involve combining aluminium sulfate and the sulfate monovalent cation. The aluminium sulfate is usually obtained by treating minerals like alum schist, bauxite and cryolite with sulfuric acid.

Types

Aluminium-based alums are named by the monovalent cation. Unlike the other alkali metals, lithium does not form alums; a fact attributed to the small size of its ion.

The most important alums are
 Potassium alum, also called "potash alum" or simply "alum"
 Sodium alum, also called "soda alum" or "SAS"
 Ammonium alum,

Chemical properties
Aluminium-based alums have a number of common chemical properties. They are soluble in water, have a sweetish taste, react as acid by turning blue litmus to red, and crystallize in regular octahedra. In alums each metal ion is surrounded by six water molecules. When heated, they liquefy, and if the heating is continued, the water of crystallization is driven off, the salt froths and swells, and at last an amorphous powder remains. They are astringent and acidic.

Crystal structure
Alums crystallize in one of three different crystal structures. These classes are called α-, β- and γ-alums. The first X-ray crystal structures of alums were reported in 1927 by James M. Cork and Lawrence Bragg, and were used to develop the phase retrieval technique isomorphous replacement.

Solubility
The solubility of the various alums in water varies greatly, sodium alum being readily soluble in water, while caesium and rubidium alums are only sparingly soluble. The various solubilities are shown in the following table.

At temperature , 100 parts water dissolve:
 {| class="wikitable" style="text-align:right;"
|-
!  !! Ammonium  !! Potassium  !! Rubidium  !! Caesium 
|-
|   0 °C ||  2.62     ||   3.90 ||  0.71     || 0.19
|-
|  10 °C ||  4.50     ||   9.52 ||  1.09     || 0.29
|-
|  50 °C || 15.9 ||  44.11 ||  4.98     || 1.235
|-
|  80 °C || 35.20     || 134.47 || 21.60     || 5.29
|-
| 100 °C || 70.83     || 357.48 || ···  || ··· 
|}

Uses
Aluminium-based alums have been used since antiquity, and are still important in many industrial processes. The most widely used alum is potassium alum. It has been used since antiquity as a flocculant to clarify turbid liquids, as a mordant in dyeing, and in tanning.  It is still widely used in water treatment, in medicine, for cosmetics (in deodorant), in food preparation (in baking powder and pickling), and to fire-proof paper and cloth.

Alum is also used as a styptic, in styptic pencils available from pharmacists, or as an alum block, available from barber shops and gentlemen's outfitters, to stem bleeding from shaving nicks; and as an astringent. An alum block can be used directly as a perfume-free deodorant (antiperspirant), and unprocessed mineral alum is sold in Indian bazaars for just that purpose. Throughout Island Southeast Asia, potassium alum is most widely known as tawas and has numerous uses. It is used as a traditional antiperspirant and deodorant, and in traditional medicine for open wounds and sores. The crystals are usually ground into a fine powder before use.

In the Victorian era, alum was used along with other substances like plaster of Paris to adulterate certain food products, particularly bread. It was used to make lower-grade flour appear whiter, allowing the producers to spend less on whiter flour. Because it retains water, it would make the bread heavier, meaning that merchants could charge more for it in their shops. The amount of alum present in each loaf of bread could reach levels that would be toxic to humans and cause chronic diarrhea, which could lead to death in young children.

Alum is used as a mordant in traditional textiles; and in Indonesia and the Philippines, solutions of tawas, salt, borax, and organic pigments were used to change the color of gold ornaments. In the Philippines, alum crystals were also burned and allowed to drip into a basin of water by babaylan (shamans) for divination. It is also used in other rituals in the animistic anito religions of the islands.

In traditional Japanese art, alum and animal glue were dissolved in water, forming a liquid known as dousa, and used as an undercoat for paper sizing.

Alum in the form of potassium aluminium sulphate or ammonium aluminium sulfate in a concentrated bath of hot water is regularly used by jewelers and machinists to dissolve hardened steel drill bits that have broken off in items made of aluminum, copper, brass, gold (any karat), silver (both sterling and fine) and stainless steel. This is because alum does not react chemically to any significant degree with any of these metals, but will corrode carbon steel. When heat is applied to an alum mixture holding a piece of work that has a drill bit stuck in it, if the lost bit is small enough, it can sometimes be dissolved / removed within hours.

Related compounds

Many trivalent metals are capable of forming alums. The most important example is chrome alum, a dark violet crystalline double sulfate of chromium and potassium, was used in tanning.

In general, alums are formed more easily when the alkali metal atom is larger. This rule was first stated by Locke in 1902, who found that if a trivalent metal does not form a caesium alum, it neither will form an alum with any other alkali metal or with ammonium.

Selenate-containing alums
Selenium or selenate alums are also known that contain selenium in place of sulfur in the sulfate anion, making selenate instead. They are strong oxidizing agents.

Mixed alums

In some cases, solid solutions of alums with different monovalent and trivalent cations may occur.

Other hydrates
In addition to the alums, which are dodecahydrates, double sulfates and selenates of univalent and trivalent cations occur with other degrees of hydration. These materials may also be referred to as alums, including the undecahydrates such as mendozite and kalinite, hexahydrates such as guanidinium  and dimethylammonium  "alums", tetrahydrates such as goldichite, monohydrates such as thallium plutonium sulfate and anhydrous alums (yavapaiites). These classes include differing, but overlapping, combinations of ions.

Other double sulfates
A pseudo alum is a double sulfate of the typical formula , where
  is a divalent metal ion, such as
 cobalt (wupatkiite), manganese (apjohnite), magnesium (pickingerite) or iron (halotrichite or feather alum), and
  is a trivalent metal ion.

Double sulfates with the general formula  are also known, where
  is a monovalent cation such as
 sodium, potassium, rubidium, caesium, or thallium, or a compound cation such as ammonium, methylammonium, hydroxylammonium or hydrazinium
  is a trivalent metal ion, such as
 aluminium, chromium, titanium, manganese, vanadium, iron, cobalt, gallium, molybdenum, indium, ruthenium, rhodium, or iridium.
Analogous selenates also occur. The possible combinations of univalent cation, trivalent cation, and anion depends on the sizes of the ions.

A Tutton salt is a double sulfate of the typical formula , where  is a univalent cation, and  a divalent metal ion.

Double sulfates of the composition , where
  is a univalent cation and
  is a divalent metal ion are referred to as langbeinites, after the prototypical potassium magnesium sulfate.

See also

 Alunite
 List of minerals
 Gum bichromate – photo prints and other similar processes use alums, sometimes as colloid (gelatin, albumen) hardeners

Footnotes

References

External links

 

Sulfates
Sulfate minerals
Traditional medicine
Astringent flavors